The Canadian Centre for Climate Modelling and Analysis (CCCma) is part of the Climate Research Division of Environment Canada and is located at the University of Victoria, Victoria, British Columbia. Its purpose is to develop and apply climate models to improve understanding of climate change and make quantitative projections of future climate in Canada and globally. Its seasonal forecasting system provides climate forecasts over Canada on timescales of months to years.

Current models 
 CGCM3 The third generation coupled global climate model
 CGCM4 The fourth generation coupled global climate model
 CanESM2 The second generation Canadian Earth System Model
 CanESM5 The Canadian Earth System Model version 5
 CanRCM The Canadian Regional Climate Model

See also 
 National Center for Atmospheric Research
 Earth Simulator
 HadCM3 - explanation of an AOGCM
 EdGCM - an educational version of a GCM

Notes

References

External links 
Official website
 Dimitri Lascaris. (December 10, 2019) New Climate Model Predicts Alarming Levels of Global Heating. Retrieved December 10, 2019

Climate modeling
Climate change in Canada
Climate change organizations
Climatological research institutes
Environment and Climate Change Canada